Curtin, West Virginia can refer to one of two small communities:

Curtin, Nicholas County, West Virginia
Curtin, Webster County, West Virginia